Oteiza may refer to:

Places: 
 Oteiza, village close to Estella-Lizarra in Navarre, Spain. 

People:
 Jorge Oteiza, a prominent Basque artist and sculptor.

Botanics:
 Oteiza (plant), a genus of plants.

Disambiguation pages